Andreas Reischek (15 September 1845 – 3 April 1902) was an Austrian taxidermist, naturalist, ornithologist and grave robber notable for his extensive natural history collecting expeditions throughout New Zealand as well as being notorious for acts of grave robbing there.  He added materially to the understanding of the biology and distribution of the New Zealand avifauna.

Early years
Reischek was born in Linz, Austria.  After attending school for a few years he worked as an apprentice to a baker and developed a strong interest in natural history, also becoming skilled in taxidermy.  He saw war service in Tyrol in 1866 during the Third Italian War of Independence and also served as a gamekeeper and guide before working as a taxidermist in Vienna.  He married Adelheid Hawlicek on 5 May 1875.

New Zealand

In 1877 Reischek was chosen by Ferdinand von Hochstetter to travel to New Zealand for two years to help set up displays at the Canterbury Museum in Christchurch, then under the directorship of Julius von Haast.

Much of Reischek's early work in New Zealand centred on the museums in Christchurch, Auckland (where he was employed between 1880 and 1888) and Whanganui but, after his initial two-year contract was completed, he made several extended collecting expeditions over the next ten years, covering most of New Zealand and its sub-Antarctic islands, collecting biological and ethnographical specimens, including Māori skulls and mummified cadavers robbed from burial sites. On his expeditions he was constantly accompanied by his dog "Caesar", who saved his life on more than one occasion.

Reischek collected not only for museums and private collectors, but primarily for himself. His ornithological collecting has been subsequently criticised for such reckless actions as shooting 150 specimens of the rare stitchbird on Little Barrier Island at a time when it had become extinct everywhere else. He was strong, physically fit and a good linguist, becoming fluent in both English and Māori. In 1885 he was elected a Fellow of the Linnean Society of London.

Later years
When Reischek returned to Austria in 1889 he took with him a huge personal collection of over 14,000 items.  Ornithological specimens alone numbered over 3000, including many of now extinct species such as the huia, and is one of the most complete in existence of New Zealand's birds.  The collection was eventually bought by friends of Reischek and presented to the Imperial Natural History Museum in Vienna.

Two years after his return his wife gave birth to a son, Andreas.  In 1892 he was asked to superintend the establishment of the Francis-Caroline Museum in Linz, the town of his birth, where he died in 1902.  He is commemorated in the name of Reischek's parakeet, endemic to New Zealand's Antipodes Islands.

Repatriation of ancestral remains 
In September 2022 the Natural History Museum in Vienna returned the remains of about 64 Māori and Moriori people, collected by Reischek, to Museum of New Zealand 
Te Papa Tongarewa in Wellington, New Zealand.

Bibliography
Reischek's book about his travels in New Zealand, "Yesterdays in Maoriland", was compiled posthumously by his son from his diaries.  It was first published in German in 1924 and was not available in an English translation until 1930.

While in New Zealand Reischek published numerous articles on natural history in Transactions and Proceedings of the New Zealand Institute (now the Royal Society of New Zealand):

 1881 – Notes on Zoological Researches made on the Chicken Islands, East Coast of the North Island. Vol.14, pp. 274–277.
 1884 – Notes on New Zealand Ornithology. Vol.17, pp. 187–198.
 1885 – Notes on New Zealand Ornithology: Observations on Pogonornis cincta (Dubus); Stitch-Bird (Tiora). Vol.18, pp. 84–87.
 1885 – Notes on New Zealand Ornithology: Observations on Procellaria parkinsoni (Grey), Brown Petrel (Taiko). Vol.18, pp. 87–90.
 1885 – Observations on Gould's Petrel (Hutton), Procellaria gouldi (Ohi), their Habits and Habitats. Vol.18, pp. 90–91.
 1885 – Observations on Cook's Petrel (Grey), Procellaria cooki (Ti Ti), their Habits and Habitats. Vol.18, pp. 92–93.
 1885 – Observations on Puffinus gavius (Forst.), Rain-bird, (Hakoakoa), their Habits and Habitats. Vol.18, 93–94.
 1885 – Observations on Puffinus assimilis (Gould), Totorore, their Habits and Habitats. Vol.18, pp. 95–96.
 1885 – Observations on the Habits of New Zealand Birds, their Usefulness or Destructiveness to the Country. Vol.18, pp. 96–104.
 1885 – Notes on the Habits of some New Zealand Birds. Vol.18, pp. 105–107.
 1885 – Observations on Sphenodon punctatum, Fringe-back Lizard (Tuatara). Vol.18, pp. 108–110.
 1885 – Notes on the Habits of the Polecat, Ferret, Mongoose, Stoat, and Weasel. Vol.18, pp. 110–112.
 1886 – Description of the Little Barrier or Hauturu Island, the Birds which inhabit it, and the Locality as a Protection to them. Vol.19, pp. 181–184.
 1886 – Notes on Ornithology. Vol.19, pp. 184–188.
 1886 – Ornithological Notes. Vol.19, pp. 188–193.
 1887 – Notes on Rats. Vol.20, pp. 125–126.
 1887 – Recent Explorations North of Chalky Sound, West Coast of Otago. Vol.20, p. 441.
 1888 – Notes on the Islands to the South of New Zealand. Vol.21, pp. 378–389.

References

Further reading
 King, Michael. (1981). The Collector. A biography of Andreas Reischek. Hodder & Stoughton: Auckland.
 Reischek, A. (1930). Yesterdays in Maoriland: New Zealand in the ‘Eighties. Wilson & Horton: Auckland.

1845 births
1902 deaths
Austrian ornithologists
New Zealand ornithologists
Austrian naturalists
Zoological collectors
New Zealand naturalists
People associated with the Auckland War Memorial Museum